Modou Dia (born 27 March 1950) is a Senegalese politician and former diplomat. Dia represented Senegal in Saudi Arabia, the Soviet Union, West Germany and Austria. He also was the Senegalese permanent representative to the Organisation of the Islamic Conference. Dia was a candidate in the February 2007 presidential election, placing last out of 15 candidates with about 0.13% of the vote.

Dia attended the Institut catholique d'arts et métiers in Lille.

References

External links
 Official web site 

1950 births
Living people
Senegalese politicians
Senegalese diplomats
Ambassadors of Senegal to Saudi Arabia
Ambassadors of Senegal to the Soviet Union
Ambassadors of Senegal to West Germany
Ambassadors of Senegal to Austria